Kristnes is a village  located in Eyjafjarðarsveit municipality in northern Iceland. The population is of around 52 inhabitants in 2018.

References 

Populated places in Iceland
Pages using the Kartographer extension
Coordinates on Wikidata